Luis María del Corazón de Jesús Dionisio Argaña Ferraro (October 3, 1932 – March 23, 1999) was a prominent Paraguayan politician and Supreme Court judge. He was an influential member of the Colorado Party and rose to the Vice-Presidency in 1998, but was assassinated in March 1999 at a time when it appeared likely that he would inherit the presidency from Raúl Cubas, who was on the verge of being impeached. The incident and its aftermath is known in Paraguay as Marzo paraguayo ("the Paraguayan March"). An airport in Paraguay, Dr. Luis María Argaña International Airport, is named for him.

Career
Argaña graduated in law and social sciences from the Universidad Nacional de Asunción in 1958. He became a Professor at the University, and entered politics, becoming a member of the Chamber of Deputies of Paraguay. He also became a judge, and was President of the Supreme Court of Paraguay (1983 - 1988).

During 1989-1990 he served as Foreign Minister.

Argaña was a judge during Paraguay's long-lasting military dictatorship under Alfredo Stroessner. He has been accused of turning a blind eye to cases of torture and political killings. Stroessner dissident Joel Filártiga accused Argaña of blocking the screening in Paraguay of the 1991 TV movie One Man's War, depicting Filártiga's search for justice for the 1976 death of his son at the hands of Stroessner's secret police.

Despite his long identification with Stroessner, Argaña was a member of the "traditionalist" faction of the Colorados, which had come to favor a more humane way of ruling the country. Soon after stepping down from the Supreme Court, he accused Stroessner of running a police state, and claimed that "imposters" had taken over the party. He went on to say that those who persecuted defenseless women or attacked priests were not really Paraguayans, let alone Colorados. He soon emerged as the de facto leader of the traditionalist faction.

1998 election as Vice-President
Luis Argaña served in a number of important national positions during previous administrations before running an ultimately unsuccessful bid for president in the 1993 election. He publicly vowed that if elected, he would allow Stroessner to return from exile. Although leading opinion polling at one point, he lost the Colorado Party primary to Juan Carlos Wasmosy who went on to win the first completely free election in the country's history.

He tried again to obtain the party's presidential nomination for the 1998 election, losing in a bitterly contested primary election against General Lino Oviedo.  Due to the General's involvement in a failed coup attempt in 1996, Oviedo was imprisoned before the 1998 general election.  Oviedo's running mate, Raúl Cubas, replaced Oviedo on the Colorado ticket, but lacked the widespread support that Oviedo commanded. Argaña was selected as Cubas' running mate, the pair subsequently being elected to office by a wide margin.

As a candidate, Argaña was criticised for bringing Stroessner's era officials back to political life, through his faction Colorado Reconciliation Movement.

1999 assassination

There was widespread belief that Cubas, a relatively weak political leader, was merely a puppet for the disgraced General Oviedo. One of Cubas' first acts as president was to grant Oviedo a pardon from prison, defying the Supreme Court. Shortly thereafter, the Chamber of Deputies of Paraguay voted to charge Cubas with abuse of power, and began investigations that would ultimately lead to formal impeachment proceedings. Had Cubas been removed from office, Argaña was set to succeed him as president.

However, on the morning of March 23, 1999, assailants ambushed the vice president's vehicle just outside his Asunción home, peppering the SUV with multiple rounds of gunfire before escaping.  President Cubas ordered a lockdown of the country's borders.  In the wake of the killing and the subsequent riots that took place in the capital area, Cubas' support melted away. The Chamber of Deputies impeached him by an overwhelming margin. Facing all-but-certain conviction and removal from office by the Senate, Cubas resigned on March 28, fleeing the country and seeking and ultimately being granted political asylum in neighboring Brazil. Senate president Luis Ángel González Macchi, who was next in line for the presidency after Argaña's death, served out the balance of Cubas' term.

Argaña's assassination has never been fully resolved, but popular theory holds that the ousted General Oviedo (who had been granted asylum in Argentina shortly after his release from prison) masterminded the crime.  Although Cubas was generally viewed to be easily manipulated by Oviedo's influence, his impeachment would mean Argaña, one of Oviedo's staunchest political rivals, would become president.  The belief that Argaña was assassinated to prevent an Oviedo opponent from running the country was strengthened when Congress sought to extradite the general from Argentina, without success.

On October 23, 1999, Pablo Vera Esteche was arrested in Paraguay. He said the murder, for which he and two other gunmen were paid a total of $300,000, was authorised by Cubas and Oviedo. Vera Esteche was sentenced to 20 years on October 24 (reduced to 18 years four years later). His accomplices were also jailed for lengthy sentences.

References

External links
 Official website of the assassination of Argaña 

Vice presidents of Paraguay
Assassinated Paraguayan politicians
1932 births
1999 deaths
Deaths by firearm in Paraguay
People murdered in Paraguay
People from Asunción
Foreign Ministers of Paraguay
Colorado Party (Paraguay) politicians
Universidad Nacional de Asunción alumni
20th-century Paraguayan lawyers
Presidents of the Chamber of Deputies of Paraguay
Paraguayan judges
1999 murders in Paraguay